Pyrrhus II (Greek: Πύρρος) was the son of Olympias II and Alexander II of Epirus. He was a brother of Ptolemy and Phthia of Macedon. He ruled as king of Epirus from 255 BC to 237 BC. He had two daughters: Deidamia II who was the last ruler of the Aeacid Dynasty and Nereis who married Gelon of Syracuse.

References

 Smith, William (editor); Dictionary of Greek and Roman Biography and Mythology, "Olympias (2)", Boston, (1867)
 Smith, William (editor); Dictionary of Greek and Roman Biography and Mythology, "Deidameia (2)", Boston, (1867)

Rulers of Ancient Epirus
Ancient Greek rulers
3rd-century BC Greek people
Ancient Epirotes